Jumpseat, also known as AFP-711  is reportedly a code name for a class of SIGINT reconnaissance satellites operated by the National Reconnaissance Office for the United States Air Force in the 1970s and 1980s. The program is classified, and much of the information in the open is speculative.

Satellites
It is believed that six Jumpseat satellites were successfully launched from Vandenberg Air Force Base on Titan IIIB launch vehicles with Agena D boosters between 21 March 1971 and 31 July 1983, the primary purpose of them being to monitor Soviet ABM radars. There was one failure, when the second satellite's Agena malfunctioned and left it in a useless orbit.

These were in similar orbits to the Satellite Data System relay satellites.

The successors to the Jumpseat series are the Trumpet satellites.

Satellites

References

General
 Richelson, Jeffrey T. ed. U.S. Military Uses of Space, 1945-1991 Vol 1, Guide. National Security Archive. 1991.

External links
Entry at astronautix.com
Entry at Gunter's space page
Log of satellite launches from Jonathan's Space Report
JUMPSEAT - SIGINT Spacecraft Series (NRO/USAF/ NSA - Program AFP-711) at GlobalSecurity.org

1971 in spaceflight
1973 in spaceflight
National Reconnaissance Office satellites
Signals intelligence satellites
Military equipment introduced in the 1970s